Kolar Gold Fields Assembly seat is one of the seats in Karnataka Legislative Assembly in India. It is a segment of Kolar Lok Sabha seat.

Members of Assembly 
 1967 : S. R. Gopal (INC)
 2008 : Y Sampangi (BJP)   
 2013 : Ramakka Y (BJP)
 2018: Roopakala Shashidhar(INC)

Election results

1967 Assembly Election
 S. R. Gopal (INC) : 20,024 votes    
 C. M. Armugam (RPI) : 15,261

2013 Assembly Election
 Ramakka Y (BJP) : 55,014 votes  
 M Backthavachalam (JD-S) : 28,992 votes

See also 
 Kolar District
 List of constituencies of Karnataka Legislative Assembly

References 

Assembly constituencies of Karnataka